The 2010 Arizona state elections were held on November 2, 2010, with primaries on August 24, 2010.  These include gubernatorial and both sides of Congress.  A special election was also on May 18 for Proposition 100.

Federal

United States Senate

John McCain announced his plans to run again for Senate on November 25, 2008, just 21 days after losing the 2008 presidential race.  McCain faced a primary challenge from former representative J.D. Hayworth, and Jim Deakin.  The Democratic candidates were Rodney B. Glassman, Rudy Garcia, and John Dougherty.

In the general election, the candidates were incumbent John McCain (R), Rodney Glassman (D), Jerry Joslyn (G), and David Nolan (L).

United States House

Elections were held for all Arizona's congressional districts, with elections in the 1st, 3rd, 5th, and 8th congressional districts being among the more heavily contended.

Republic John Shadegg, the incumbent in the 3rd district, announced that he would not seek re-election on January 14, 2010. On the Republican side, Ben Quayle, son of former vice-president Dan Quayle, announced his on February 12, 2010, despite never voting in a local election. Other notable Republicans in the race include former state representative Sam Crump, former state senators Pamela Gorman and Jim Waring, and former Paradise Valley Mayor Vernon Parker.  The only Democrat in that race is Jon Hulburd.

Both the 5th and 8th districts' Democratic incumbents, Harry Mitchell and Gabby Giffords, respectively, are seeking reelection. Mitchell faces a Republican challenge from former Maricopa County  Treasurer David Schweikert, Jeffrey W. Smith, Jim Ward while Gifford's biggest Republican challengers include former State Senator Jonathan Paton and construction manager Jesse Kelly.

State

Governor

On January 20, 2009, Janet Napolitano was confirmed as United States Secretary of Homeland Security by Barack Obama and resigned as governor the next day.  Since Arizona does not have a lieutenant governor, Secretary of State Jan Brewer took over office.  Brewer announced her intentions to run for full term in November 2009.  The other Republican candidates were state treasurer Dean Martin, Owen "Buz" Mills, former Arizona Board of Regents president John Munger, Matthew Jette, and Tom Gordon.  At one point, Sheriff Joe Arpaio was considering a run for governor, but eventually declined.  On June 2, 2010, John Munger dropped out of the race.

The only Democratic challenger was Attorney General Terry Goddard.  The Libertarian Party had Ronald Cavanaugh, Bruce Olsen, Alvin Ray Yount, and Barry Hess facing off while Larry Gist was on the ballot for the Green Party.

Jan Brewer won the Republican primary with approximately 80% of the vote while Democrat Terry Goddard moved on with no opposition.  Barry Hess won the Libertarian primary and Larry Gist won the Green primary. Incumbent Jan Brewer won the election with 54.3% of the vote.

Secretary of State
When Jan Brewer succeeded Janet Napolitano as governor, she appointed Republican Ken Bennett to replace her as Secretary of State. The Democratic challengers are Sam Wercinski and Chris Deschene. Bennett went on to seek a full term.

Deschene won the Democratic primary with 62% of the vote and faced Bennett in the general election.

Results

Attorney General
Attorney Democratic Terry Goddard  ran for governor.  The three Democrats who ran to fill the vacancy  were Arizona's House minority leader David Lujan as well as Felecia Rotellini and Vince Rabago both former assistant attorney general. The Republican race was between superintendent of public instruction Tom Horne and former Maricopa County attorney Andrew Thomas.

Both primary elections were close.  In the Democratic primary, Felecia Rotellini beat out David Lujan by only 3,000 votes, less than 1% of the total votes.  On the Republican side, Tom Horne declared victory on August 28, with an 853-vote lead.  However,  his opponent, Andrew Thomas, did not concede the race until August 31.

Results

Judicial positions
Multiple judicial positions were up for election in 2010.
 Arizona judicial elections, 2010 at Judgepedia

Ballot measures

On May 18, 2010, a special election was held for Proposition 100.  It was passed by an almost two-thirds margin. It will temporarily raise the Arizona state sales tax from 5.6% to 6.6%, with two-thirds of the revenue generated going to support education. After three years, the tax will automatically be repealed.

On the November 2, 2010 ballot, ten measures have been certified:
 Proposition 106 Prohibit rules against participation in specific health care
 Proposition 107 Ban preferential acceptance to employment (affirmative action)
 Proposition 109 Give a constitutional protection to the right to hunt in Arizona
 Proposition 110 Authorizes exchange of state trust lands in order to protect military installations
 Proposition 111 Rename the position of Secretary of State to Lieutenant Governor
 Proposition 112 Change initiative petition drive deadline by two months earlier than current deadline
 Proposition 113 Extend the right of Arizonans to use a secret ballot in union elections
 Proposition 203 Legalization of medical marijuana
 Proposition 301 Transfer money from a land-conservation fund to the general fund in the state budget
 Proposition 302 Repeal First Things First education program
 Arizona 2010 ballot measures at Ballotpedia

References

External links
 Elections from the Arizona Secretary of State
 Candidates for Arizona State Offices at Project Vote Smart
 Arizona Candidate List at Imagine Election – Search for candidates by address or zip code
 Arizona Polls at Pollster.com
 Arizona at Rasmussen Reports
 Arizona Congressional Races in 2010 campaign finance data from OpenSecrets
 Arizona 2010 campaign finance data from Follow the Money
 Arizona judicial elections, 2010 at Judgepedia
 Arizona 2010 ballot measures at Ballotpedia

 
Arizona